The Giardino Botanico Montano di Pratorondanino is a nature preserve and botanical garden located at 750 meters altitude in Pratorondanino, Campo Ligure, Province of Genoa, Liguria, Italy. It is open during the warmer months.

History 
The garden was established in 1979 by GLAO (Group Ligure Amatori Orchids), and since 1983 has expanded to encompass additional species, primarily from the Alps and Apennine mountain.

Species 
Its collections include: 
 14 species of rhododendrons
 2 specimens commonly called sequoia: Sequoiadendron giganteum and Sequoia sempervirens
 Ginkgo biloba
 a rare Wollemia nobilis
 many orchids especially Cypripedium
 Ligurian mountain flora including Viola bertolonii and Cerastium utriense
 a collection of 50 Sempervivum 
 numerous Sedum
 endangered species including: Eryngium alpinum, Lilium pomponium and Wulfenia carinthiaca. 

It also contains numerous trees common to the region including: 
Abies alba
 Fagus sylvatica
 Larix decidua
 Castanea sativa
 Picea abies
 Pinus mugo
 Prunus avium
 Quercus petraea
 Robinia pseudoacacia
 Sorbus aucuparia
 Taxus baccata

See also 
 List of botanical gardens in Italy

Image gallery

Bibliography

References 

 BGCI entry
 Newsletter (Italian)
 Photographs

Botanical gardens in Italy
Gardens in Liguria
Buildings and structures in the Province of Genoa
Metropolitan City of Genoa